Malayali is a 2009 Indian Malayalam-language film directed by C. S. Sudhesh and starring Kalabhavan Mani.

Plot 
Madhavan is an old fashioned guy who is loved by everyone in his village.  Madhavan loves Malayalam and the Malayalee culture, unlike his brothers Satheeshan and Rameshan. They (and their respective wives) dislike Madhavan playing "big brother" and making all the decisions. Madhavan's brothers-in-law are also against him.

Satheeshan, Rameshan and the brothers-in-law plan to build a heritage resort on their land, which is ancestral property being looked after by Madhavan. Madhavan initially opposes the move but leaves it to his brothers when his mother forces him.

Madhavan goes to Palani, to pray at the temple there. There he meets retired station master Viswanathan Menon. Menon is there to recover the money that one Gounder owes him. But things take a twist when Menon is found dead in his lodge room. Madhavan is arrested as a suspect, but is released after it is proved that the death was due to heart failure. Madhavan anyway decides to go to Viswanathan Menon's place. The plot develops from there.

Cast

References

External links
 

2009 films
2000s Malayalam-language films
Indian family films
Films shot in Thrissur
Films shot in Palakkad
Films shot in Palani